The Henry C. Daryaw a bulk cargo carrier that sank in the St. Lawrence river on November 21, 1941. She was in the shipping channel carrying a load of coal.

References

Maritime incidents in November 1941
1919 ships